Pollanisus incertus is a moth of the family Zygaenidae. It is found along the coast of north-eastern Queensland, Australia.

The length of the forewings is about 8 mm for males and about 8.5 mm for females.

The larvae feed on Tetracera nordtiana.

External links
Australian Faunal Directory
Zygaenid moths of Australia: a revision of the Australian Zygaenidae

Moths of Australia
incertus
Moths described in 2005